The 1994 European Promotion Cup for Men was the 4th edition of this tournament. It was hosted in Dublin, Ireland and the host team achieved its first title ever after beating Cyprus in the final game.

Preliminary round

Group A

Group B

Classification games

Final round

Bracket

Final

Final ranking

External links
FIBA Archive

1994
1993–94 in European basketball
International sports competitions hosted by Ireland
Basketball competitions in Ireland
1994 in Irish sport